Qalyub orthonairovirus, also known as Qalyub nairovirus or simply Qalyub virus, is a negative-sense single-stranded RNA virus discovered in a rat's nest in a tomb wall in the Egyptian town of Qalyub in 1952.  The primary vector for transmission is the Carios erraticus tick, and thus it is an arbovirus.

There is no evidence of clinical disease in humans.

References

External links

Nairoviridae
Viral diseases
Species described in 1952